Coşeriu may refer to:
 
Eugenio Coșeriu (1921–2002), Romanian-born linguist
Coşeriu, a village in Urmeniș Commune, Bistrița-Năsăud County, Romania

See also
 Coșeiu, a commune located in Sălaj County, Romania